Dana Andersen is a Canadian actor, improvisor, filmmaker, writer and director. He is an alumnus of The Second City, and has worked closely with Mike Myers, Ryan Stiles, and Joe Flaherty, among others. He currently serves as director of the live improvised soap opera Die-Nasty, and has been a core member of the troupe since its founding in 1991. From 1995-1999, he co-hosted The Johnny and Poki Variety Hour at Edmonton's Varscona Theatre. His theatre credits include shows with Teatro la Quindicina, Panties Productions, and Rapid Fire Theatre.  Film credits for Andersen include Purple Gas, Turnbuckle!, and Stray Dogs. He has written, directed and produced a number of independent films, including Rio Loco, Subplot, Subplot II and Hearts of Plastic.

Current work

In 2005, Andersen exported the Die-Nasty company's annual Soap-A-Thon to England, working with legendary British theatre artist Ken Campbell to produce a 36-hour-long soap opera in London. Several members of Campbell's company made the pilgrimage to Canada in 2006 and 2007 to take part in the original 53-hour-long event. In January 2008, Andersen returned to London (along with several members of the Die-Nasty troupe) to direct the 50-hour Improvathon at the People Show Studios.
There, he worked with the likes of Adam Meggido, Oliver Senton, and Ruby Lake. He was joined by Canadian improvisors Kory Mathewson, Matt Alden, Kurt Smeaton, Davina Stewart, Jamie Knifefight Cavanagh, Mark Meer, Belinda Cornish, and Musical Director Jan Randall.

Andersen is the recipient of a Dora Mavor Moore Award for co-writing the revue Not Based on Anything by Stephen King with Second City. He has been nominated for several Elizabeth Sterling Haynes Awards, and received the Sterling Award for Outstanding Fringe Production for co-writing and starring in the play Giant Ants.

Dana's most ambitious undertaking to date will be his upcoming one-man show celebrating the short, but remarkable life of his inspiration and guide, Seph Warphunzic. Set to the music of Eighties band, Martha and the Muffins, the play will be a comedy/sci-fi/musical with a sort of "Mars Attacks" meets "West Side Story" feel to it.

Miscellany

Dana appeared in a video for a song by Ian Thomas in the 80s which aired on Much Music. This was filmed in the period of time that Dana was with Second City.

Mike Myers credits Dana as being part of the creative inspiration for his SNL character 'Dieter'. The inspiration came from their work together at Second City in Toronto.

References

External links

 Die-Nasty Homepage 

Year of birth missing (living people)
Living people
Canadian male comedians
Canadian people of Danish descent
Dora Mavor Moore Award winners
20th-century Canadian comedians
21st-century Canadian comedians
Canadian sketch comedians